The Battle of Coyotepe Hill was a significant engagement during the United States occupation of Nicaragua from August through November 1912 during the insurrection staged by Minister of War General Luis Mena against the government of President Adolfo Díaz.

Coyotepe is an old fortress located on a 500-foot hill overlooking the strategic railroad line near Masaya roughly halfway between Managua and Granada, Nicaragua.

Battle
On 2 to 4 October 1912, a Nicaraguan rebel force led by General Benjamín Zeledón occupying Coyotepe and another hill, Barranca fort, overlooking the strategic rail line, refused to surrender to government troops under President Adolfo Díaz. U.S. Marine Major Smedley Butler's Marine battalion, with whom Zeledón's rebels had skirmished on September 19, returned from its capture of Granada, Nicaragua on 3 October and shelled the rebel stronghold on Coyotepe. 

During pre-dawn hours on 4 October Butler's battalion, in concert with two Marine battalions and one from the  led by Marine Colonel Joseph H. Pendleton converged from different positions to storm the hill and capture it. Zeledón was killed during the battle, probably by his own men.

Aftermath

With the capture of León, Nicaragua two days later by U.S. Marines and the recapture of Masaya by Nicaraguan government troops, the Nicaraguan revolution of 1912 was essentially over. During the Somoza dictatorship the fortress was used as a prison. Occasionally dissidents imprisoned there would be taken from the fortress in a helicopter and dropped into a nearby volcano.

See also
Battle of Fort Dipitie

References

History of Nicaragua
Coyotepe Hill
Coyotepe Hill
Coyotepe Hill
1912 in Nicaragua
Coyotepe Hill
October 1912 events